In Arabic onomastics ("nisbah"), al-Badisi denotes a relationship to or from the town of Badis. It may refer to:

 Abd al-Haqq al-Badisi (died after 1322), Moroccan biographer
 Muhammad ibn al-Qasim al-Badisi (d. 1922), Moroccan astronomer, poet and writer
 Abu Yaqub Yusuf al-Zuhayli al-Badisi (d. 1333), 14th century Moroccan saint and savant

Nisbas